Joshua Barker Flint (October 13, 1801, Cohasset, Massachusetts – March 19, 1864, Louisville, Kentucky) was an American physician, Massachusetts state legislator, and professor of surgery, noteworthy as one of the pioneers of the use of ether as an anesthetic.

Biography
Joshua B. Flint graduated from Harvard College with A.B. in 1820. He then taught for two years at Boston's English Classical School before matriculating at Harvard Medical School, where he received his M.D. degree in 1825. From 1825 to 1837 he practiced medicine in Boston. where he was several times elected to the Massachusetts State Legislature. Before the Presidency of Martin Van Buren, Flint was a member of the Whig Party but, upon Van Buren's election in 1837, became a member of the Democratic Party and continued in that Party. He was a strong supporter of the Union side during the 1860s. From May 1831 to May 1832 he was one of the curators for the Boston Society of Natural History. From 1832 to 1835 he was one of the editors, along with Abel Lawrence Peirson, Elisha Bartlett, and Augustus Addison Gould, for The Medical Magazine. Upon the invitation of Dr. Charles Caldwell, Flint accepted the professorial chair of Surgery in the Louisville Medical Institute (which was established in 1837). From 1837 to 1840 he held that professorial chair, but then resigned to devote himself to medical practice. He spent most of the year 1838 visiting various medical establishments in Europe, where he also purchased books for the Louisville Medical Institute Library. In 1846 the Louisville Medical Institute became the Medical Department of the University of Louisville; in 1849 Flint was appointed there Professor of the Principles and Practice of Surgery, retaining that professorship until he died in 1864.

Joshua B. Flint, the son of Rev. Jacob Flint and Sylvia Baker, married in April 1841 Nannie W. Trimble, the youngest daughter of Robert Trimble. There were no children from the marriage.

Selected publications

References

External links
 
 

1801 births
1864 deaths
19th-century American physicians
American surgeons
Harvard College alumni
Harvard Medical School alumni
University of Louisville faculty